The 1996 Chinese Football Super Cup (Chinese: 1996年中国足球超霸杯赛) was the 2nd Chinese Football Super Cup, contested by Chinese Jia-A League 1996 winners Dalian Wanda and 1996 Chinese FA Cup winners Beijing Guoan. Dalian Wanda beat Beijing Guoan 3–2 at Shenzhen Stadium, thus winning their first Chinese Football Super Cup title.

Match details

References 

1996 in Chinese football
1996